That which is scarce is of insufficient quantity to fulfill all human wants and needs.

Scarce may also refer to:

 Scarce (band), an American alternative rock band
 Scarce (surname), a surname